Chrystel Robert (born 31 July 1973) is a French tumbling gymnast. She is an eight-time world champion and three-time European champion.

From 1989 to 2000, Robert was the French national champion every year except 1997, when her teammate Karine Boucher won the title. She completed a grand slam in 1992 and 1993, winning all major titles: the 1992 IFSA and FIT world championships and the 1993 World Games.

References

External links
 
 

French female trampolinists
1973 births
Living people
World Games gold medalists
World Games silver medalists
Competitors at the 1989 World Games
Competitors at the 1993 World Games
Competitors at the 1997 World Games
Medalists at the Trampoline Gymnastics World Championships
20th-century French women